Hans Fischböck  (24 January 1895 – 3 July 1967) was an Austrian banker who was the economics minister and minister of finance of Austria and the finance minister of Nazi occupied Holland.

He was born in Geras, Austria and studied in Vienna. From 1915 to 1918 he served in the Austro-Hungarian Army and was deployed to the front in the South of the County of Tyrol. After the First World War, in 1919 he gained a doctorate in Vienna and then worked in the Austrian banking system.

In March 1938, after the Anschluss of Austria by Germany, Fischböck was appointed economics minister and in May 1938 he was appointed Minister of finance and took measures for the expropriation of Jewish property. After the invasion of the Netherlands, Arthur Seyss-Inquart appointed him minister of finance of the occupied Netherlands and he served in this capacity from 1940 to 1945. From March 1941 he was involved in the expropriation of Jewish property and sending forced laborers to Germany to work in the arms industry.

After the German capitulation Fischböck managed with help from the organization ODESSA to escape to Argentina. In Austria, a prosecution was brought against him but a conviction was not secured and in 1957 his acts fell under an amnesty. In 1958 he returned to Europe and he died in Marburg, Germany in 1967.

External links
 

Austro-Hungarian military personnel of World War I
Austrian bankers
Austrian Nazis
Netherlands in World War II
Holocaust perpetrators in the Netherlands
1895 births
1967 deaths
Members of the Reichstag of Nazi Germany